Copromyza is a genus of flies belonging to the family lesser dung flies.

Species
C. borealis Zetterstedt, 1847
C. equina Fallén, 1820
C. hackarsi (Vanschuytbroeck, 1948)
C. montana Rohček, 1992
C. neglecta (Malloch, 1913)
C. nigrina (Gimmerthal, 1847)
C. pappi Norrbom & Kim, 1985
C. pedipicta Richards, 1959
C. pseudostercoraria Papp, 1976
C. stercoraria (Meigen, 1830)
C. zhongensis Norrbom & Kim, 1985

References

Sphaeroceridae
Muscomorph flies of Europe
Schizophora genera